The 1970–71 British Home Championship was an international football competition between the British Home Nations. The tournament was low-scoring affair, reflecting trends in world football at the time, which relied on heavy defense. England won the tournament in their final match by beating Scotland following an earlier victory over Ireland and a draw with the Welsh. The England versus Scotland match saw more goals than the rest of the tournament put together, but Ireland did manage to gain a rare second-place position with 1–0 wins over disappointing Welsh and Scottish sides, whose own match for last place was a goalless draw.

Table

Results

References

External links
Full Results and Line-ups

1971
1971 in British sport
1970–71 in Northern Ireland association football
1970–71 in English football
1970–71 in Welsh football
1970–71 in Scottish football